Making the Cut was a Canadian reality series that followed a group of amateur ice hockey players through a rigorous training session.

The first season was broadcast on CBC Television in 2004. In 2006, the second season was moved to Global where its name was expanded to Making the Cut: Last Man Standing.

Season 1 
In the first season, 68 players participated in a grueling two-week training camp in Vernon, British Columbia to compete for one of six invitations to an NHL training camp, one for each Canadian team. Those 68 players were divided into two teams, "Team Blue" and "Team Gold". Former NHL coaches Mike Keenan and Scotty Bowman served as General Managers for this season, alongside a team of other hockey scouts and coaches. Scott Oake served as the host for this season.

The song "Big League" by Canadian rock musician Tom Cochrane was the theme song for the first season of the show.

The winners of that season were as follows:

Season 2 
In the second season, one winner received a $250,000 endorsement contract and representation from a top NHL agent.

During the second season, Mike Keenan returned as the lone General Manager of the series.

Franklin MacDonald of Nova Scotia was the winner of that season, and earned a contract with the Florida Panthers of the National Hockey League, playing three seasons with their American Hockey League affiliate at the time, the Rochester Americans.  , he was playing for EHC Black Wings Linz of the Austrian Hockey League.

David Brine became the first contestant from the series to make the NHL when he made his debut with the Panthers on February 2, 2008 against the Tampa Bay Lightning.

The song "Get Thru This" by Vancouver rock band Art of Dying was the theme song for the second season of the show.

References

External links
Making The Cut's YouTube channel

2004 Canadian television series debuts
Global Television Network original programming
2000s Canadian reality television series
National Hockey League on television
CBC Television original programming
2004–05 in Canadian ice hockey
2005–06 in Canadian ice hockey
2006–07 in Canadian ice hockey
2007 Canadian television series endings